Theosebia, also known as Theosebia the Deaconess, was a 4th-century Christian leader, who is honored as a saint in the Eastern Orthodox Church. As a saint she is referred to as Blessed Theosebia the Deaconess.

Her life and identification is ambiguous: her years of birth and death are uncertain (probably subsequent to 381). However, she is thought to have played an important role in the church in Nyssa, where she was called diakonissa, the deaconess or wife of a deacon.

Gregory Nazianzen wrote a letter of condolence on her death to Gregory of Nyssa in which Gregory Nazianzen mentioned "your sister Theosebia" and "true yoke-fellow of a priest". Hither comes the ambiguity of her identification. Some historians supposed Theosebia was the wife of Gregory of Nyssa, others suppose she was one of his sisters like Macrina the Younger. If so, then Theosebia was the sister of Basil the Great as well.

Gregory of Nyssa—unlike the other Cappadocian Fathers—was married, according to his own testimony in his work On Virginity that he could not benefit from the subject of his own work. This, combined with Nazianzen's statement that Theosebia was buried by the other Gregory in the aforementioned letter, suggest that she was indeed either Gregory of Nyssa's wife or sister, whose funeral he would have been obliged to oversee.

The St Theosevia Centre for Christian Spirituality is in Oxford. Donald Allchin was director of the centre from 1987 to 1994.

The Cappadocian Gregory of Nazianzus wrote to Gregory of Nyssa about Theosebia, “the pride of the church, the ornament of Christ, the finest of our generation, the free speech of women, Theosebia, the most illustrious among the brethren, outstanding in beauty of soul. Theosebia, truly a priestly personage, the colleague of a priest, equally honored and worthy of the great sacraments."

Bibliography

Ramelli, Ilaria. "Theosebia: A Presbyter of the Catholic Church" in Journal of Feminist Studies in Religion; Vol. 26, Nº 2 (Fall 2010), pp. 79–102

References

Saints from Roman Anatolia
4th-century Christian saints
Late Ancient Christian female saints